Funiculaire Moléson-sur-Gruyères – Plan-Francey is a funicular railway in the Canton of Fribourg, Switzerland. The line leads from Moléson-sur-Gruyères at 1111 m to Plan-Francey at 1520 m. From there, an aerial cableway continues to the summit of Moléson (2002 m). The line of the funicular has a length of about 1350 m and a difference of elevation of 409 m. The funicular with two cars has a single track with a passing loop.

Built in 1998, it replaced an aerial cableway from the 1960s. Already in the 1900s projects of funiculars, rack-railways and a train line to the top of Moléson were made, some receiving concessions, but ultimately not realized.

The funicular is owned and operated by the company Centre Touristique Gruyères-Moléson-Vudalla S.A. (abbreviated TTM or "GMV SA").

Notes

References 

Moleson
Transport in the canton of Fribourg
Gruyères
1200 mm gauge railways in Switzerland
Railway lines opened in 1998

fr:Le Moléson#Funiculaire